The Central City Police Department (CCPD) is a fictional police department servicing Central City, as depicted in comic books published by DC Comics, in particular those tied into the Flash books.

History of CCPD
Central City Police Department is both an ally and opponent of Flash, the superhero long-established in Central City.

Darryl Frye
Darryl Frye is the Captain of the Central City Police. He has seen the Crime Lab division decline over the years from the best the Mid West had to offer, to a department mired in wrongful convictions and budget cuts. Frye became the legal guardian to Barry Allen after his mother was killed and his father was put in prison.

Barry Allen
While still a senior at college, Barry helped the authorities apprehend a bank robber, and he was offered a job as a police scientist for the Central City Police Department Scientific Detection Bureau. One night during an electrical storm at the Crime Lab, Barry returned to an experiment after a short break. All of a sudden, a bolt of lightning streaked through the window, knocked him over, and smashed down certain chemicals, giving him a bath in them. This accident gave Barry his powers of Super-speed which he later went on to fight crime as the Flash.

Current roster

Former members

In other media

Television
 Central City Police Department is featured in the 1990 television series, The Flash.
 Central City Police Department featured in the Justice League Unlimited TV series. Wally West worked there as a Crime Scene Investigator, much like Barry Allen.
 In the second season of Arrow, CSI Barry Allen of the Central City Police Department assists Starling City Police with a break-in and theft at a Queen Consolidated warehouse by Cyrus Gold. In season five, Dinah Drake is a former CCPD detective who specialized in undercover operations.
 Central City Police Department is featured in the 2014 series The Flash.

Films
 CCPD appears in the animated film Justice League: The Flashpoint Paradox when Barry first wakes up at his desk to learn that the world has changed. His Captain asks him about the Elongated Kid Murderer.
 CCPD is mentioned in the DC Extended Universe. In the film Justice League, Barry Allen was hired for the department's forensic lab after having been given a recommendation from Bruce Wayne.

Video games
 The Central City Police Department appears in DC Universe Online. Learning that someone was tampering with his past, the Flash (Barry Allen) sends a pair of heroes to the night of the lightning strike via the Cosmic Treadmill to stop the meddlers from altering the timeline.

References

 
Central City
Central City
Flash (comics)